Mohammad Naeem Rahimi (born 4 April 1994) is an Afghan football midfielder. He previously played for Malaysia Premier league club DRB-HICOM, where his contract needed in October 2014. Mohammad Naeem Rahimi is a player capable of defending at one end but also playing a prominent role in his team's attacking moves at the other end of the field.

He generally possesses a good engine, stamina, passing ability, strong tackling and finishing prowess. He previously played for Watanga FC in Monrovia, Liberia, the highest football league in Liberia. Before that he was playing for Bankstown Berries FC The Bankstown Berries are a soccer club based in Bankstown, New South Wales Australia and move to Sydney Olympic and Sydney United 58 in NPL New South Wales, Australia. then later move to Victoria and played in NPL Victoria for Pascoe Vale and his last club played for Altona Magic.

Career
Naeem played for Bankstown Berries first grade for 3 years since 2011.
Mohammad Naeem Rahimi is a player capable of defending at one end but also playing a prominent role in his team's attacking moves at the other end of the field.  He generally possesses a good engine, stamina, passing ability, strong tackling and finishing prowess.

International
He made his debut for the Afghanistan national football team on 23 March 2019 in a friendly against Malaysia, as a 71st-minute substitute for Zohib Islam Amiri.

References

External links

1994 births
Living people
People from Shiraz
Afghan footballers
Afghanistan international footballers
Afghan expatriates in Iran
Afghan expatriate footballers
Expatriate soccer players in Australia
Expatriate footballers in Malaysia
Expatriate footballers in Singapore
Association football midfielders
Altona Magic SC players
Sportspeople from Fars province